Mauricio José Yedro (born 10 May 1987) is an Argentine footballer which plays for Ecuadorian Serie A side Olmedo.

Honours

Club
Huachipato
 Primera División de Chile (1): 2012 Clausura

Coquimbo Unido
 Primera B de Chile (1): 2018

References

External links

 
 
 

1987 births
Living people
People from Belgrano Department, Santa Fe
Argentine footballers
Argentine expatriate footballers
Association football midfielders
Club de Gimnasia y Esgrima La Plata footballers
Defensa y Justicia footballers
Montevideo Wanderers F.C. players
Santiago Morning footballers
C.D. Huachipato footballers
Deportes Iquique footballers
Fuerza Amarilla S.C. footballers
Coquimbo Unido footballers
C.D. Olmedo footballers
Uruguayan Primera División players
Chilean Primera División players
Primera B de Chile players
Ecuadorian Serie A players
Argentine expatriate sportspeople in Chile
Argentine expatriate sportspeople in Uruguay
Argentine expatriate sportspeople in Ecuador
Expatriate footballers in Chile
Expatriate footballers in Uruguay
Expatriate footballers in Ecuador
Sportspeople from Santa Fe Province